Jaime José Soto Kaempfer (born 20 April 1992) is a Chilean footballer who plays for Cobreloa.

References

1992 births
Living people
Chilean footballers
Chilean Primera División players
Deportes Temuco footballers
Unión Temuco footballers
Deportes Valdivia footballers
Coquimbo Unido footballers
Association football midfielders
People from Valdivia